Kolbe Academy is a homeschool provider and online academy based in Napa, California.

Background
Kolbe Academy Homeschool was founded in 1983 and provides homeschooling curriculum and materials, record keeping and educational advice from its offices in Napa, California. Since 2013, Kolbe Academy has offered online courses to High School and Jr. High students. Although it originally grew out of a private day school in Napa, Kolbe Academy is its own entity and exists independently from that institution.

Pedagogy
Kolbe Academy adheres to the Ignatian method of learning centered around a curriculum that is classically based. Kolbe is known for its great books approach to learning which requires that students maintain a rigorous reading schedule.

Accreditation
Kolbe Academy is accredited by the National Association of Private Catholic and Independent Schools (NAPCIS).

Notes and references

External links
 http://kolbe.org/

Catholic secondary schools in California
Catholic elementary schools in California
High schools in Napa County, California
Education in Napa County, California
Roman Catholic Diocese of Santa Rosa
1993 establishments in California